Randy Jo Hobbs (March 22, 1948 – August 5, 1993) was an American musician born in Winchester, Indiana. Hobbs played bass for The McCoys during the 1965-1969 period and in the bands of the brothers Edgar Winter and Johnny Winter during 1970-1976.

Career
He played bass with Jimi Hendrix on some 1968 live sessions which were later released unofficially as Woke Up This Morning and Found Myself Dead (1980) and New York Sessions (1998), and officially as Bleeding Heart (1994). He joined up with a later version of Montrose, appearing on the Jump on It album, released in 1976.  That same year, he also played bass on Rick Derringer's album with Dick Glass, Glass Derringer.

Death
Randy Jo Hobbs was found dead of heart failure, aged 45, in a hotel room in Dayton, Ohio, in 1993 and is buried in his hometown of Union City, Indiana.

References

1948 births
1993 deaths
American rock musicians
Musicians from Indiana
People from Winchester, Indiana
People from Union City, Indiana
20th-century American musicians
Montrose (band) members